North Forks is a Canadian unincorporated community in Northfield Parish, Sunbury County, New Brunswick.

It is located 17 kilometres north-northeast of Minto, and near Humphrey Corner.

History

Notable people

See also
List of communities in New Brunswick

References

Communities in Sunbury County, New Brunswick